Abdulaziz bin Abdul Rahman Al Saud (15 January 1875 – 9 November 1953), known in the West as Ibn Saud (Ibn Suʿūd), was an Arab tribal, political, and religious leader who founded Saudi Arabia – the third Saudi state – and reigned as its first king from 23 September 1932 until his death in 1953. He had ruled parts of the kingdom since 1902, having previously been Emir, Sultan, and King of Nejd, and King of Hejaz.

Ibn Saud was the son of Abdul Rahman bin Faisal, Emir of Nejd, and Sara bint Ahmed Al Sudairi. The family were exiled from their residence in the city of Riyadh in 1890. Ibn Saud reconquered Riyadh in 1902, starting three decades of conquests that made him the ruler of nearly all of central and north Arabia. He consolidated his control over the Nejd in 1922, then conquered the Hejaz in 1925. He extended his dominions into what later became the Kingdom of Saudi Arabia in 1932. Ibn Saud's victory and his support for Islamic revivalists would greatly bolster pan-Islamism across the Islamic world. Concording with Wahhabi beliefs, he ordered the demolition of some of the holiest sites of Islam, the Al-Baqi Cemetery and the Jannat al-Mu'alla. As King, he presided over the discovery of petroleum in Saudi Arabia in 1938 and the beginning of large-scale oil production after World War II.

Early life and family origins

The Al Saud family had been a power in central Arabia for the previous 130 years. Under the influence and inspiration of Wahhabism, the Saudis had previously attempted to control much of the Arabian Peninsula in the form of the Emirate of Diriyah, the First Saudi State, until its destruction by an Ottoman army in the Ottoman–Wahhabi War in the early nineteenth century.

Abdulaziz bin Abdul Rahman, also known as Ibn Saud, was born on 15 January 1875 in Riyadh. He was the fourth child and third son of Abdul Rahman bin Faisal, one of the last rulers of the Emirate of Nejd, the Second Saudi State, a tribal sheikhdom centered on Riyadh. Ibn Saud's mother was Sara bint Ahmed of the Sudairi family. She died in 1910. His full-siblings were Faisal, Noura, Bazza, Haya and Saad. He also had a number of half-siblings from his father's other marriages, including Muhammad, Abdullah, Ahmed, and Musaid, who all had roles in the Saudi government. Ibn Saud was taught Quran by Abdullah Al Kharji in Riyadh.

Exile and recapture of Riyadh
In 1891, the House of Saud's long-term regional rivals led by Muhammad bin Abdullah Al Rashid conquered Riyadh. Ibn Saud was 15 at the time. He and his family initially took refuge with the Al Murrah, a Bedouin tribe in the southern desert of Arabia. Later, the Al Sauds moved to Qatar and stayed there for two months. Their next stop was Bahrain where they stayed briefly. The Ottoman State allowed them to settle in Kuwait where they settled and lived for nearly a decade. Ibn Saud developed a rapport with the Kuwaiti ruler Mubarak Al Sabah and frequently visited his majlis. His father, Abdul Rahman, did not endorse these visits, perceiving Mubarak's lifestyle as immoral and unorthodox.

On 14 November 1901 Ibn Saud and some relatives, including his half-brother Muhammad and several cousins (amongst them Abdullah bin Jiluwi), set out on a raiding expedition into the Nejd, targeting mainly tribes associated with the Rashidis. On 12 December they reached Al Ahsa and then proceeded south towards the Empty Quarter with the support from various tribes. Upon this Abdulaziz Al Rashid sent messages to Qatari ruler Jassim bin Mohammed Al Thani and to the Ottoman governor of Baghdad asking their help to stop Ibn Saud's raids on the tribes loyal to Al Rashid. These events led to a decrease in the number of Ibn Saud's raiders, and his father also asked him to cancel his plans to capture Riyadh. However, Ibn Saud did not cancel the raid and managed to reach Riyadh. On the night of 15 January 1902, he led 40 men over the city walls on tilted palm trees and took the city. The Rashidi governor of the city, Ajlan, was killed by Abdullah bin Jiluwi in front of his own fortress. The Saudi recapture of the city marked the beginning of the third Saudi State.<ref>Current Biography 1943', pp. 330–334</ref> 

Soon after Ibn Saud's victory the Kuwaiti ruler Mubarak Al Sabah sent him an additional seventy warriors led by Ibn Saud's younger brother Saad. Ibn Saud began to live in the palace of his grandfather, Faisal bin Turki, in Riyadh when he settled in the city.

Rise to power
 Gazetteer of the Persian Gulf, Oman and Central Arabia

Following the capture of Riyadh, many former supporters of the House of Saud rallied to Ibn Saud's call to arms. He was a charismatic leader and kept his men supplied with arms. Over the next two years, he and his forces recaptured almost half of the Nejd from the Rashidis.

In 1904, Abdulaziz bin Mutaib Al Rashid appealed to the Ottoman Empire for military protection and assistance. The Ottomans responded by sending troops into Arabia. On 15 June 1904, Ibn Saud's forces suffered a major defeat at the hands of the combined Ottoman and Rashidi forces. His forces regrouped and began to wage guerrilla warfare against the Ottomans. Over the next two years, he was able to disrupt their supply routes, forcing them to retreat. However, in February 1905 Ibn Saud was named qaimmaqam of southern Nejd by the Ottomans. Ibn Saud's victory in Rawdat Muhanna, in which Abdulaziz Al Rashid died, ended the Ottoman presence in Nejd and Qassim by the end of October 1906. This victory also weakened the alliance between Mubarak Al Sabah, ruler of Kuwait, and Ibn Saud due to the former's concerns about the increase of Saudi power in the region.
 
Ibn Saud completed his conquest of the Nejd and the eastern coast of Arabia in 1912. He then founded the Ikhwan, a military-religious brotherhood, which was to assist in his later conquests, with the approval of local Salafi ulema. In the same year, he instituted an agrarian policy to settle the nomadic pastoralist bedouins into colonies and to replace their tribal organizations with allegiance to the Ikhwan.

In May 1914, Ibn Saud made a secret agreement with the Ottomans as a result of his unproductive attempts to get protection from the British. However, due to the outbreak of World War I, this agreement which made Ibn Saud the wali or governor of Najd was not materialized, and because of the Ottomans' attempt to develop a connection with Ibn Saud the British government soon established diplomatic relations with him. The British agent, Captain William Shakespear, was well received by the Bedouin. Similar diplomatic missions were established with any Arabian power who might have been able to unify and stabilize the region. The British entered into the Treaty of Darin in December 1915, which made the lands of the House of Saud a British protectorate and attempted to define the boundaries of the developing Saudi state. In exchange, Ibn Saud pledged to again make war against Ibn Rashid, who was an ally of the Ottomans.

The British Foreign Office had previously begun to support Hussein bin Ali, Sharif of Mecca and Emir of the Hejaz, by sending T. E. Lawrence to him in 1915. The Saudi Ikhwan began to conflict with Hussein in 1917, just as his sons Abdullah and Faisal entered Damascus. The Treaty of Darin remained in effect until superseded by the Jeddah conference of 1927 and the Dammam conference of 1952, during both of which Ibn Saud extended his boundaries past the Anglo-Ottoman Blue Line. After Darin, he stockpiled the weapons and supplies which the British provided him, including a 'tribute' of £5,000 per month. After World War I he received further support from the British, including a glut of surplus munitions. He launched his campaign against the Al Rashidi in 1920; by 1922 they had been all but destroyed.

The defeat of the Al Rashidi doubled the size of Saudi territory because, after the war of Ha'il, Ibn Saud sent his army to occupy Al Jouf and the army led by Eqab bin Mohaya, the head of the Talhah tribe. This allowed Ibn Saud the leverage to negotiate a new and more favorable treaty with the British in 1922, signed at Uqair. He met Percy Cox, British High Commissioner in Iraq, to draw boundaries and the treaty saw Britain recognize many of Ibn Saud's territorial gains. In exchange, Ibn Saud agreed to recognize British territories in the area, particularly along the Persian Gulf coast and in Iraq. The former of these were vital to the British, as merchant traffic between British India and the United Kingdom depended upon coaling stations on the approach to the Suez Canal.

In 1925, Ibn Saud's forces captured the holy city of Mecca from Sharif Hussein, ending 700 years of Hashemite rule. Following this he issued the first decree which was about the collection of zakat. On 8 January 1926, the leading figures in Mecca, Medina and Jeddah proclaimed Ibn Saud the King of Hejaz and the bayaa (oath of allegiance) ceremony was held in the Great Mosque of Mecca.

Ibn Saud raised Nejd to a kingdom as well on 29 January 1927. On 20 May 1927, the British government signed the Treaty of Jeddah, which abolished the Darin protection agreement and recognized the independence of the Hejaz and Nejd, with Ibn Saud as their ruler. For the next five years, Ibn Saud administered the two parts of his dual kingdom as separate units. He also succeeded his father, Abdul Rahman, as Imam.

With international recognition and support, Ibn Saud continued to consolidate his power. By 1927, his forces had overrun most of the central Arabian Peninsula, but the alliance between the Ikhwan and the Al Saud collapsed when Ibn Saud forbade further raiding. The few portions of central Arabia that had not been overrun by the Saudi-Ikhwan forces had treaties with London, and Ibn Saud was sober enough to see the folly of provoking the British by pushing into these areas. This did not sit well with the Ikhwan, who had been taught that all non-Wahhabis were infidels. In order to settle down the problems with the Ikhwan leaders, including Faisal Al Duwaish, Sultan bin Bajad and Dhaydan bin Hithlain, Ibn Saud organized a meeting in Riyadh in 1928, but none of them attended the meeting. Tensions finally boiled over when the Ikhwan rebelled. After two years of fighting, they were suppressed by Ibn Saud in the Battle of Sabilla in March 1929.

On 23 September 1932, Ibn Saud formally united his realm into the Kingdom of Saudi Arabia, with himself as its king. He transferred his court to Murabba Palace from the Masmak Fort in 1938 and the palace remained his residence and the seat of government until his death in 1953.

Ibn Saud had to first eliminate the right of his own father in order to rule, and then distance and contain the ambitions of his five brothers, particularly his brother Muhammad, who had fought with him during the battles and conquests that gave birth to the state.

Oil discovery and his rule

Petroleum was discovered in Saudi Arabia in 1938 by SoCal, after Ibn Saud granted a concession in 1933. Through his advisers St John Philby and Ameen Rihani, Ibn Saud granted substantial authority over Saudi oil fields to American oil companies in 1944. Beginning in 1915, he signed a "friendship and cooperation" pact with Britain to keep his militia in line and cease any further attacks against their protectorates for whom they were responsible.

Ibn Saud's newly found oil wealth brought a great deal of power and influence that he would use to advantage in the Hejaz. He forced many nomadic tribes to settle down and abandon "petty wars" and vendettas. He began widespread enforcement of the new kingdom's ideology, based on the teachings of Muhammad Ibn Abd al-Wahhab. This included an end to traditionally sanctioned rites of pilgrimage, recognized by the orthodox schools of jurisprudence, but at odds with those sanctioned by Muhammad ibn Abd al-Wahhab. In 1926, after a caravan of Egyptians on the way to Mecca were beaten by his forces for playing bugles, he was impelled to issue a conciliatory statement to the Egyptian government. In fact, several such statements were issued to Muslim governments around the world as a result of beatings suffered by the pilgrims visiting the holy cities of Mecca and Medina. With the uprising and subsequent suppression thereafter of the Ikhwan in 1929, the 1930s marked a turning point. With his rivals eliminated, Ibn Saud's ideology was in full force, ending nearly 1,400 years of accepted religious practices surrounding the Hajj, the majority of which were sanctioned by a millennium of scholarship.

The King established a Shura Council of the Hejaz as early as 1927. This council was later expanded to 20 members and was chaired by Ibn Saud's son Prince Faisal.

Foreign wars
Ibn Saud was able to gain loyalty from tribes near Saudi Arabia, such as those in Jordan. For example, he built very strong ties with Rashed Al-Khuzai from the Al Fraihat tribe, one of the most influential and royally established families during the Ottoman Empire. Prince Rashed and his tribe had dominated eastern Jordan before the arrival of Sharif Hussein. Ibn Saud supported Rashed and his followers in rebellion against Hussein.

In 1934 Saudi Arabia defeated Yemen in the Saudi-Yemeni War. This was the first modern war - the Saudis had British Rolls-Royce armoured cars and French Renault FT-17 tanks - between Arab states.

In 1935 Prince Rashed supported Izz ad-Din al-Qassam's defiance, which led him and his followers into rebellion against Abdullah I of Jordan. In 1937, when they were forced to leave Jordan, Prince Rashed Al Khuzai, his family, and a group of his followers chose to move to Saudi Arabia where Prince Rashed lived for several years under Ibn Saud's hospitality.

Charity works
Ibn Saud's charity earned him respect among his people. The King would direct money to be handed to the impoverished whenever he saw them. This is why the poor would eagerly anticipate his appearance in villages, towns, and even the desert.Abdul-Hameed Al-Khateeb. The Just Imam, Part 2, pp.102-103

"O Abdul-Aziz, may Allah give you in the Hereafter as He has given you in the world!" an elderly woman once said to Ibn Saud's procession. The King ordered that she be given ten bags of money from his car. Ibn Saud noticed the old woman having trouble bringing the money back to her home, so he had his aid service deliver the money and accompany her back to her home. Ibn Saud was on a picnic outside of Riyadh when he came across an elderly man dressed in rags. The old man proceeded to stand up in front of the King's horse and said, "O Abdul-Aziz, it is terribly cold, and I have no clothes to protect me". Ibn Saud, saddened by the man's condition, removed his cloak and gave it to him. He also offered the elderly man a stipend to help him with his everyday costs.

Due to the abundance of the poor, Ibn Saud established a guest house known as the "Thulaim" or "The Host", where rice, meat, and several types of porridge were distributed to the poor. As the economy deteriorated, Ibn Saud began to increase his aid to the needy. He gave them "royal kits" of bread and "waayid," which were monetary gifts given to them on an annual basis. The King said, "I haven't obtained all this wealth by myself. It is a blessing from Allah, and all of you have a share in it. So, I want you to guide me to whatever takes me nearer to my Lord and qualifies me for His forgiveness."

Later years

Ibn Saud positioned Saudi Arabia as neutral in World War II, but was generally considered to favor the Allies. However, in 1938, when an attack on a main British pipeline in the Kingdom of Iraq was found to be connected to the German Ambassador, Fritz Grobba, Ibn Saud provided Grobba with refuge. It was reported that he had been disfavoring the British as of 1937.

In the last stage of the war, Ibn Saud met significant political figures. One of these meetings, which lasted for three days, was with U.S. President Franklin Delano Roosevelt on 14 February 1945. The meeting took place on board  in the Great Bitter Lake segment of the Suez Canal. The meeting laid down the basis of the future relations between the two countries. The other meeting was with British Prime Minister Winston Churchill in the Grand Hotel du Lac on the shores of the Fayyoun Oasis, fifty miles south of Cairo, in February 1945. Saudis report that the meeting heavily focused on the Palestine problem and was unproductive in terms of its outcomes, in contrast to that with Roosevelt.

In 1948, Ibn Saud participated in the Arab-Israeli War, but Saudi Arabia's contribution was generally considered token.

After naming his son Saud as crown prince, the King left most of his duties to him, and he spent most of his time in Ta'if.

While most of the royal family desired luxuries such as gardens, splendid cars, and palaces, Ibn Saud wanted a royal railway from the Persian Gulf to Riyadh and then an extension to Jeddah. His advisors regarded this as an old man's folly. Eventually, ARAMCO built the railway, at a cost of $70 million, drawn from the King's oil royalties. It was completed in 1951 and was used commercially after the King's death. It enabled Riyadh to grow into a relatively modern city. But when a paved road was built in 1962, the railway lost its traffic.

Personal life

Ibn Saud was tall, his height reported as between 1.93 m (6 ft 4 in)Kenneth Williams. (1933) Ibn Saʻud: the puritan king of Arabia, J. Cape, p. 21 and 1.98 m (6 ft 6 in). He was known to have a strong, charming, and charismatic personality that earned him respect among his people and foreign diplomats. His family and others described Ibn Saud as an affectionate and caring man.

Ibn Saud had twenty-two consorts. Many of his marriages were contracted in order to cement alliances with other clans, during the period when the Saudi state was founded and stabilized. He was the father of almost one hundred children, including forty-five sons. Mohammed Leopold Weiss reported in 1929 that one of his spouses poisoned Ibn Saud in 1924 which caused poor sight of one eye. He later forgave her, but at the same time divorced her.

One of the significant publications about Ibn Saud in the Western media was a comprehensive article by Noel Busch published in Life magazine in May 1943 which introduced him as a legendary monarch.

Ibn Saud had a kennel for salukis, a dog breed originated in the Middle East. He gave two of his salukis, a male and a mate, to British Field Marshal Sir Henry Maitland Wilson who brought them to Washington D.C., USA. Of them, the male named Ch Abdul Farouk won a championship in the USA.

Relations with family members
Ibn Saud was said to be very close to his paternal aunt, Jawhara bint Faisal. From a young age, she ingrained in him a strong sense of family destiny and motivated him to regain the lost glory of the House of Saud. During the years when the Al Saud family were living almost as refugees in Kuwait, Jawhara bint Faisal frequently recounted the deeds of his ancestors to Ibn Saud and exhorted him not to be content with the existing situation. She was instrumental in making him decide to return to Nejd from Kuwait and regain the territories of his family. She was well educated in Islam, in Arab custom and in tribal and clan relationships. She remained among the King's most trusted and influential advisors all her life. Ibn Saud asked her about the experiences of past rulers and the historical allegiance and the roles of tribes and individuals. Jawhara was also deeply respected by the King's children. The King visited her daily until she died around 1930.

Ibn Saud was also very close to his sister Noura, who was one year older. On several occasions, he identified himself in public with the words: "I am the brother of Noura." Noura died a few years before her brother, and the King was deeply saddened by her death.

Assassination attempts
On 15 March 1935, three armed men from Oman attacked and tried to assassinate Ibn Saud during his performance of Hajj. He survived the attack unhurt, and three assassins were arrested. Another assassination attempt occurred in 1951 when Captain Abdullah Al Mandili, a member of Royal Saudi Air Force, tried to bomb the King's camp from an airplane. The attempt was unsuccessful and Al Mandili escaped to Iraq with the help of tribes.

Successor
Ibn Saud appointed his second son, Prince Saud, heir to the Saudi throne in 1933. He had many quarrels with his brother Muhammad bin Abdul Rahman as to who should be appointed heir. Muhammad wanted his son Khalid to be designated the heir.

Ibn Saud's eldest son Turki, who was the crown prince of the Kingdoms of Nejd and Hejaz, died at age 18, predeceasing his father. Turki's younger full-brother Saud was appointed Crown Prince. Had Turki not died, he would have been the Crown Prince.

When the King discussed succession before his death, he favoured Prince Faisal as a possible successor over Crown Prince Saud due to Faisal's extensive knowledge, as well as his years of experience. Since Faisal was a child, Ibn Saud recognised him as the most capable of his sons and often tasked him with responsibilities in war and diplomacy. In addition, Faisal was known to embrace a simple Bedouin lifestyle. "I only wish I had three Faisals", Ibn Saud once said when discussing who would succeed him. However, he made the decision to keep Prince Saud as crown prince in the fear that doing otherwise would lead to decreased stability.

Views
Ibn Saud said, "Two things are essential to our state and our people ... religion and the rights inherited from our fathers." He also remarked, "We know what to avoid, and we know what to accept for our own benefit."

Amani Hamdan argues that the King's attitude towards women's education was encouraging since he expressed his support in a conversation with St John Philby in which he stated, "It is permissible for women to read."

Ibn Saud repeated the following views about the British authorities many times: "The English are my friends, but I will walk with them only so far as my religion and honor will allow." He had much more positive views about the United States, including finance, and in 1947 when the World Bank was suggested to him as the source of development loans instead of the US Export-Import Bank, Ibn Saud reported that Saudi Arabia would do business with and be indebted to the United States instead of other countries and international agencies.

Shortly before his death, the King stated, "Verily, my children and my possessions are my enemies." and "In my youth and manhood, I made a nation. Now, in my declining years, I make men for it." His last words to his two sons, the future King Saud and the next in line Prince Faisal, who were already battling each other, were "You are brothers, unite!"

A staunch opponent of Zionism, Ibn Saud had a highly ambivalent opinion of the Jews. On the one hand he thought of the Jews, at least those who were not Zionists, as "[g]ood friends of the Arabs", opposed declaring an anti-Jewish jihad and fiercly condemned the anti-Jewish 1929 Hebron massacre, which he considered a clear violation of Islamic principles. On the other hand he often expressed his dislike for the Jews by referring to the Quran and the Hadith. In 1937 he called them "a race accursed by God" who are "destined to final destruction and eternal damnation". For him they were "enemies of Islam and prophet Muhammad" and "enemies of the Muslims until the end of the world." In some instances he made use of antisemitic tropes, calling the Jews a "dangerous and hostile race" with an "exaggerated love of money", accusing them of "making trouble wherever they exist" or igniting conflicts between Muslims and Christians.

Death and funeral
Ibn Saud experienced heart disease in his final years and also, was half blind and racked by arthritis. In October 1953, his illness became serious. He died in his sleep of a heart attack in Shubra Palace in Ta'if on 9 November 1953 at the age of 78, and Prince Faisal was at his side.

The funeral prayer was performed at Al Hawiyah in Ta'if. Ibn Saud's body was brought to Riyadh where he was buried in Al Oud cemetery next to his sister Noura.

U.S. President Dwight D. Eisenhower issued a message on Ibn Saud's death on 11 November 1953. U.S. Secretary of State John Foster Dulles stated after the King's death that he would be remembered for his achievements as a statesman.

State honors

On 23 November 1916, British diplomat Sir Percy Cox arranged the Three Leaders Conference in Kuwait where Ibn Saud was awarded the Star of India and the Order of the British Empire. He was appointed an honorary Knight Grand Commander of the Order of the Indian Empire (GCIE) on 1 January 1920. He was awarded the British Order of the Bath (GCB) in 1935, the American Legion of Merit in 1947, and the Spanish Order of Military Merit (Grand Cross with White Decoration) in 1952.

See also
 King of the Sands (2012 film) – a biopic film on Ibn Saud directed by Najdat Anzour

Notes

References

Further reading
 

Sources

 Michael Oren. (2007) Power, Faith and Fantasy: The United States in the Middle East, 1776 to the Present. Norton.
 S. R. Valentine. "Force & Fanaticism: Wahhabism in Saudi Arabia and Beyond", Hurst & Co, London, 
 Muneer Husainy and Khalid Al Sudairi. (27 November 2009). History of Prince Rashed Al-Khuzai with King Abdul Aziz Al Saud. Noon. Cairo, Egypt
 The political relationship between Prince Rashed Al-Khuzai, Sheikh Izz ad-Din al-Qassam, and Saudi Arabia  Arab News Network, London – United Kingdom
 The political relationship between Prince Rashed Al-Khuzai and Sheikh Izz ad-Din al-Qassam, The Arab Orient Center for Strategic and civilization studies London, United Kingdom.
 John A. De Novo. (1963). American Interests and Policies in the Middle East 1900–1939 University of Minnesota Press.

 

 Aaron David Miller. (1980). Search for Security: Saudi Arabian Oil and American Foreign Policy, 1939–1949. University of North Carolina Press.
 Christopher D O'Sullivan. (2012). FDR and the End of Empire: The Origins of American Power in the Middle East. Palgrave Macmillan. 
 Al Sabah – Formal Egyptian magazine, Rashed Al Khuzai article. published in Cairo on 29 March 1938.
  James Parry. (January/February 1999). 
"A Man for our Century", Saudi Aramco World, pp. 4–11
 H. St. J. B. Philby. (1955). Saudi Arabia.
 George Rentz. (1972). "Wahhabism and Saudi Arabia". in Derek Hopwood, ed., The Arabian Peninsula: Society and Politics.
 Amin al Rihani. (1928). Ibn Sa'oud of Arabia. Boston: Houghton–Mifflin Company.

 Richard H. Sanger. (1954). The Arabian Peninsula Cornell University Press.

 Benjamin Shwadran. (1973). The Middle East, Oil and the Great Powers, 3rd ed. 
 Gary Troeller. (1976). The Birth of Saudi Arabia: Britain and the Rise of the House of Sa'ud. London: Frank Cass.
 Karl S Twitchell. (1958) Saudi Arabia Princeton University Press.
 Van der D. Meulen. (1957). The Wells of Ibn Saud''. London: John Murray.

External links

 
 

20th-century Saudi kings
1875 births
1953 deaths
 
Arabs from the Ottoman Empire
Burials at Al Oud cemetery
Chief Commanders of the Legion of Merit
Foreign recipients of the Legion of Merit
Founding monarchs
Honorary Knights Grand Commander of the Order of the Indian Empire
Honorary Knights Grand Cross of the Order of the Bath
People from Riyadh
Saudi Arabian Sunni Muslims
Survivors of terrorist attacks
World War II political leaders